The Trofeo Città di San Vendemiano is a professional one day cycling race held annually in Italy. It is part of UCI Europe Tour in category 1.2U.

Winners

References

Cycle races in Italy
UCI Europe Tour races
Recurring sporting events established in 1947
1947 establishments in Italy